Christmas with Cliff is the 46th studio album by British pop singer Cliff Richard, released on 25 November 2022 by East West Records. The album entered the UK Albums Chart at number two, becoming Richard's 47th top 10 solo album.

Christmas with Cliff consists of 13 new recordings of Christmas music, including three newly written songs ("First Christmas", "Heart of Christmas", and "Six Days After Christmas (Happy New Year)"). It is Richard's third Christmas album following Together with Cliff Richard (1991) and Cliff at Christmas (2003).

Commercial performance
The album debuted at number two on the UK Albums Chart, with first-week sales of 24,358 units. It is Richard's highest-charting album since the number-one album, The Album (1993). Christmas with Cliff is also his 47th top 10 solo album.

Track listing

Notes 
  signifies a co-producer

Charts

Certifications

References

2022 Christmas albums
Cliff Richard albums
East West Records albums
Christmas albums by English artists